The 3"/50 caliber gun (spoken "three-inch fifty-caliber") in United States naval gun terminology indicates the gun fired a projectile  in diameter, and the barrel was 50 calibers long (barrel length is 3 in × 50 = ). Different guns (identified by Mark numbers) of this caliber were used by the U.S. Navy and U.S. Coast Guard from 1900 through to 1990 on a variety of combatant and transport ship classes.

The gun is still in use with the Spanish Navy on Serviola-class patrol boats.

Early low-angle guns

Low-angle (single-purpose/non-anti-aircraft) mountings for this gun had a range of 7000 yards at the maximum elevation of 15 degrees. The gun entered service around 1900 with the s, and was also fitted to s. By World War II these guns were found only on a few Coast Guard cutters and Defensively Equipped Merchant Ships.

Low-angle 3"/50 caliber guns (Marks 3, 5, 6, and 19) were originally mounted on ships built from the early 1900s through the early 1920s and were carried by submarines, auxiliaries, and merchant ships during the Second World War.  These guns fired the same  ammunition used by the following dual-purpose Marks, but with range limited by the maximum elevation of the mounting.  These were built-up guns with a tube, partial-length jacket, hoop and vertical sliding breech block.

Dual-purpose guns of the World Wars

During World War II, they were the primary gun armament on destroyer escorts, patrol frigates, submarine chasers, minesweepers, some fleet submarines, and other auxiliary vessels, and were used as a secondary dual-purpose battery on some other types of ships, including some older battleships. They also replaced the original low-angle 4"/50 caliber guns (Mark 9) on "flush-deck"  and s to provide better anti-aircraft protection. The gun was also used on specialist destroyer conversions; the "AVD" seaplane tender conversions received two guns; the "APD" high-speed transports, "DM" minelayers, and "DMS" minesweeper conversions received three guns, and those retaining destroyer classification received six.

These dual-purpose guns were "quick-firing", meaning that they used fixed ammunition, with powder case and projectile permanently attached, and handled as a single unit weighing 34 pounds (as opposed to older guns and/or heavier guns, in which the shell and powder are handled and loaded separately, which reduces the weight of each handled component, but slows the loading process). The shells alone weighed about 13 pounds including an explosive bursting charge of 0.81 pounds for anti-aircraft (AA) rounds or 1.27 pounds for High Capacity (HC) rounds, the remainder of the weight being the steel casing. Useful life expectancy was 4300 effective full charges (EFC) per barrel.

This is not to be confused with the "rapid-fire" of later gun mounts that used an autoloader mechanism to insert the fixed QF ammunition into the breech. This in turn is not to be confused to a fully automatic gun. The autoloader was still manually filled with shells.

Submarine deck guns
The 3"/50 caliber gun Marks 17 and 18 was first used as a submarine deck gun on R-class submarines launched in 1918–1919. At the time it was an improvement on the earlier 3"/23 caliber gun. After using larger guns on many other submarines, the 3"/50 caliber gun Mark 21 was specified as the standard deck gun on the Porpoise- through s launched in 1935–1942. The small gun was chosen to remove the temptation to engage enemy escort vessels on the surface. The gun was initially mounted aft of the conning tower to reduce submerged drag, but early in World War II it was shifted to a forward position at the commanding officer's option. Wartime experience showed that larger guns were needed. This need was initially met by transferring 4"/50 caliber guns from S-class submarines as they were shifted from combat to training roles beginning in late 1942. Later, the 5"/25 caliber gun, initially removed from battleships sunk or damaged in the attack on Pearl Harbor and later manufactured in a submarine version, became standard.

Cold War anti-aircraft gun

During the final year of the Second World War, it was found that multiple hits from Oerlikon 20 mm cannon and Bofors 40 mm guns were often unable to shoot down high-speed Japanese kamikaze aircraft at short ranges before they hit Allied ships; the 3"/50 caliber gun was adopted as a more powerful replacement for these weapons.

The 3"/50 caliber gun (Mark 22) was a semiautomatic anti-aircraft weapon with a power-driven automatic loader and was fitted as single and twin mounts. Although intended as a one-for-one replacement for the 40 mm mounts, the new  mounts were heavier than expected, and on most ships, the mounts could only replace Bofors guns on a two-for-three basis. The mounts were of the dual purpose, open-base-ring type and the right and left gun assemblies were identical. The mounts used a common power drive that could train at a rate of 30 degrees/second and elevate from 15 degrees to 85 degrees at a rate of 24 degrees/second. The cannon was fed automatically from an on-mount magazine which was replenished by two loaders on each side of the cannon.

With proximity fuze and fire-control radar, a twin 3"/50 mount firing 50 rounds per minute per barrel was considered more effective than a quad Bofors 40 mm gun against subsonic aircraft, but relatively ineffective against supersonic jets and cruise missiles. Destroyers that were modernized during the Fleet Rehabilitation and Modernization (FRAM) program of the 1960s had their  guns removed. Experimentation with an extended range variant (3"/70 Mark 26 gun) was abandoned as shipboard surface-to-air missiles were developed. The United States Navy considered contemporary 5"/38 caliber guns and 5"/54 caliber Mark 42 guns more effective against surface targets. The gun is still in service on warships of the Philippine Navy.

The 17 s mounted a single 3"/50 Mk 34 as their primary armament.

Ships mounting 3"/50 caliber guns

World War I 

 s
 s
 s
 s
 s
 s
 s
 s
 s
 s
 R-class submarines
  cruisers
 s
 s
 s
 s
 s

World War II 

The 3-inch/50 was standard-issue on at least 63 classes of ships that have a strong association with World War II.
The total number of vessels amounts to
 10 light cruisers
 119 submarines (est. maximum 119 installed)
 498 destroyer escorts and frigates (1494 installed, 111 removed)
 1110 patrol boats, mine sweepers and submarine chasers (1110 up to 1453 installed)
 161 landing craft / amphibious assault ships (247 installed)
 116+ auxiliaries (274 installed)

Submarines listed here were built in the 1930s under the limitations of the Washington Naval Treaty and its successors during a period of isolationism and economic austerity. The division into classes was typically a result of construction during a particular fiscal year, but the number built each year was small.
The Gatos became a mass produced iteration of this line of research and development, because they coincided with the Two-Ocean Navy Act.
Starting with the  class of submarines, the 5-inch/25-caliber gun became the standard deck gun of the US Navy
 2  (FY33)
 10 Porpoise (FY34, FY35)
 6  (FY36)
 10  (FY37, FY38)
 12  (FY39, FY40)
 2  (FY40)
 77  (FY41)

Destroyer escorts were a relative late-comer with production commencing in 1942
Thus they were all mass produced. They were quick to build and entered service in 1943.
Later war-time classes had a main armament of two 5-inch/38, APD conversions had one such gun. Separation into classes is a result of different propulsion systems used and whether or not torpedoes were carried.
 3 guns per vessel
 probably all manually loaded Mark 21 or Mark 22
 65  (diesel-electric, short hull, no torpedoes)
 102  (turbo-electric, 3 torpedoes)
 37 converted to APDs after commissioning, all 3-inch guns removed
 72  (diesel-electric, 3 torpedoes)
 85  (geared diesel, 3 torpedoes)
 78 s
 32 of 97 Evarts and 46 of 148 Buckley converted before commissioning, all 3-inch guns retained
 75 s (3 guns per ship)
 essentially a destroyer escort with a merchant hull and triple expansion steam engines)
 21 s (3 guns per ship)
 21 of 96 Tacoma in Royal Navy service

Converted destroyers of the WW1-era  and  classes were equipped with 3-inch/50 guns while being converted to high speed transports (3 guns), minelayers (3), minesweepers (3) or seaplane tenders (2).

Patrol boats of less than 1000 tons, some of which were wooden boats. These minesweepers were equipped with anti-submarine warfare equipment and their designs are closely related to the submarine chasers. Submarine chasers can be characterized as smaller, cheaper, coastal waters destroyer escorts. All ships in this group used diesel propulsion.
 2 s (1 per boat)
 343 s (1 or 2 per boat)
 123 s (1 per boat)
 68 s (1 per boat
 95 s (1 per boat)
 481  yard minesweepers (1 per boat)

Amphibious Assault Ships

 130 Landing Craft Support (1 per vessel)
 Attack transports
 Based on pre-war cargo ships
 8  (4 per ship)
 2  (4 per ship)
 5  (4 per ship)
  (4)
  (1)
 Type C3 ship
 7  (4 per ship)
 3  (4 per ship)
 2  (2 per ship)
 Type P1 ship
 2  (4 per ship)

Auxiliary vessels, typically made of a cargo or tanker hull
 T1 tanker
 23 s (4 per ship)
 34 s (1 per ship)
 T2 tanker
 16 (geared turbine) s (4 per ship)
 14 (turbo-electric) s (4 per ship)
 12 (turbo-electric) s (4 per ship)
 T3 tanker
 5 s (4 per ship)
 23 of 35 s (4 per ship)
 C1 Cargo
 63 s (C1-M-AV1) (1 per ship)
 C2 Cargo
 7 s (C2-S-B1) (4 per ship)
 2 s (C2-S-AJ1) (4 per ship)
 8 s (C2-S-AJ1) (4 per ship)
 7 s (4 per ship)
 C3 Cargo
 4 s (4 per ship)
 Liberty Ships
 18 s (Z-ET1-S-C3) (1 per ship)
 48 of 65 s (EC2-S-C1) (1 per ship)
 16 s (Z-EC2-S-C5) (2 per ship)
 11 s (EC2-S-C1) (1 per ship)
 40 s (1 per ship)
 15 s (1 per ship)
 32 s (1 per ship)
 10 s (1 per ship)
 12 s (1 per ship)
 49 s (1 per boat)
 29  fleet tugs (1 per boat)
 27  fleet tugs (1 per boat)
 17 s (1 per ship)
 6 s (3 or 4 per ship)
 9 s (2 per ship)
 3 s (1 per ship)
 2 s (2 per ship)
 4 s (1 per ship)
 13 s (1 per ship)
 6 s (1 per ship)
 20 s (1 per ship)

Others
 s (8 per ship, upgraded from 2)
 the only vessels in the World War II category that had any armor.
 s

Post–World War II 

Individual ships:
  – built with 2 twin mounts
  – built with 4 twin mounts, reduced to 2 during 1967 refit (Canada)
  – refit with 7 twin mounts
  – built with 4 twin mounts
  – built with 2 single mounts
  – built with 6 twin mounts

Ship classes:
 s – refit up to 6 guns
 s – built with 4 twin mounts
 s – built with one Mark 33 twin mount forward (Canada)
 s – built with a single mount
  – built with 4 single mounts
 s – built with 4 twin mounts
 s – refit up to 20 guns
 s – built with 2 single mounts
 s – built with 4 twin mounts
 s – built with 1 twin and 1 single mount
 s – built with 4 twin mounts
 s – built with 2 single mounts
 s – built with 3 twin mounts
 s – built with 1 twin and 2 single mounts
 s – built with 2 twin mounts
 s – built with 10 twin mounts
 s – refit up to 24 guns
 s – built with 2 twin mounts
 s – refit up to 6 guns
 s – built with 2 twin mounts
 s – refit up to 6 guns
 s – converted from Liberty ships with 2 single mounts
 s – built with 4 twin mounts, some reduced to 2 mounts to provide space for missile launchers
 s – built with 4 twin mounts
 s – built with 2 twin mounts
 s – built with one Mark 33 twin mount aft except , which received two Mark 33 twin mounts (one forward, one aft) (Canada)
 s – built with 4 twin mounts
 s – refit up to 40 guns
 s – built with 4 or 6 twin mounts
 s – built with 2 twin mounts
 s – built with 4 twin mounts
 s – built with one Mark 33 twin mount aft, those refitted to the Improved Restigouche configuration had them removed (Canada)
 s – built with 2 twin mounts
 s – built with 4 twin mounts
 s – built with 2 twin mounts
 s – built originally with 2 Mark 33 twin mounts, later had one mount removed (Canada)
 s – built with 2 twin mounts
 s – built with 3 twin mounts
 s – built with 6 twin mounts
 s – built with 4 twin mounts
 s – built with 2 single and 11 twin mounts

Gallery

See also 
 
 
 Deck gun

Notes

Footnotes

References

External links 
 

76 mm artillery
Naval anti-aircraft guns
Naval guns of the United States
World War I anti-aircraft guns
World War I naval weapons
World War II anti-aircraft guns
World War II naval weapons